Renán Cleominio Zoreda Novelo (born 20 July 1950) is a Mexican politician and lawyer affiliated with the PAN. He served as Senator of the LX Legislature of the Mexican Congress representing Yucatán.

References

1950 births
Living people
Politicians from Yucatán (state)
People from Mérida, Yucatán
20th-century Mexican lawyers
Members of the Senate of the Republic (Mexico)
National Action Party (Mexico) politicians
21st-century Mexican politicians
Members of the Congress of Yucatán